Quah Ting Wen  (born 18 August 1992) is a Singaporean professional swimmer who specialises in butterfly, freestyle and individual medley events. She is currently representing DC Trident at the International Swimming League.

Education
Quah was educated at Raffles Girls' School and Raffles Institution, before graduating from the University of California, Los Angeles in 2014.

Swimming career

Collegiate level
Quah had represented the UCLA Bruins during her time at the University of California, Los Angeles.

International level

2005 Southeast Asian Games
Quah first represented Singapore on the international level in the 2005 Southeast Asian Games.

2008 Olympic Games
At the 2008 Olympic Games, Quah failed to qualify in the heats of  the 400m Individual Medley event but set a new national record (4:51.25).

2009 Asian Youth Games
Quah was Singapore's flag bearer for the 2009 Asian Youth Games. She won three individual gold medals in the 50 m, 100 m and 200 m freestyle events while setting national records for all three (25.43, 55.57 and 1:59.21). She won the team gold and bronze medals in the 4 × 100 m freestyle relay and 4 × 100 m medley relay events, respectively.

2013 FINA Swimming World Cup
Quah set a new national record in the 200 m freestyle event in the second leg of the 2013 FINA Swimming World Cup, held in Berlin, Germany. Her new timing of 1:58.80 was 0.09 seconds faster than Lynette Lim's three-day-old record of 1:58.89.

Southeast Asian Games
Quah has represented Singapore and won, at the following games:

 2005 Southeast Asian Games (2 silvers, 2 bronzes)
 2006 Commonwealth Games
 2006 Asian Games
 2007 Southeast Asian Games (2 golds, 3 silvers)
 2009 Southeast Asian Games (4 golds, 2 silvers, 1 bronze)
 2013 Southeast Asian Games (2 golds, 3 silvers)
 2014 Asian Games
 2015 Southeast Asian Games(4 golds, 4 silvers)
 2017 Southeast Asian Games (4 golds, 1 silver, 1 bronze)

Personal life
Quah has a younger brother, Quah Zheng Wen, and a younger sister, Quah Jing Wen, who both are national swimmers of Singapore as well.

References

External links
 
 
 
 

1992 births
Living people
Swimmers at the 2008 Summer Olympics
Swimmers at the 2016 Summer Olympics
Olympic swimmers of Singapore
Swimmers at the 2006 Asian Games
Swimmers at the 2010 Asian Games
Swimmers at the 2014 Asian Games
Swimmers at the 2018 Asian Games
Asian Games bronze medalists for Singapore
Medalists at the 2018 Asian Games
Singaporean sportspeople of Chinese descent
Commonwealth Games competitors for Singapore
Swimmers at the 2014 Commonwealth Games
Swimmers at the 2018 Commonwealth Games
Southeast Asian Games gold medalists for Singapore
Southeast Asian Games silver medalists for Singapore
Southeast Asian Games bronze medalists for Singapore
Southeast Asian Games medalists in swimming
Asian Games medalists in swimming
Competitors at the 2005 Southeast Asian Games
Competitors at the 2007 Southeast Asian Games
Competitors at the 2009 Southeast Asian Games
Competitors at the 2013 Southeast Asian Games
Competitors at the 2015 Southeast Asian Games
Competitors at the 2017 Southeast Asian Games
Competitors at the 2019 Southeast Asian Games
Competitors at the 2021 Southeast Asian Games
Singaporean female freestyle swimmers
Singaporean female butterfly swimmers
Singaporean female medley swimmers
Raffles Girls' Secondary School alumni
Raffles Institution alumni
Swimmers at the 2020 Summer Olympics
UCLA Bruins women's swimmers
Swimmers at the 2022 Commonwealth Games
21st-century Singaporean women